Progress M1-4, identified by NASA as Progress 2P, was a Progress spacecraft used to resupply the International Space Station. It was a Progress M1 11F615A55 spacecraft, with the serial number 253.

Launch and first docking
Progress M1-4 was launched by a Soyuz-U carrier rocket from Site 1/5 at the Baikonur Cosmodrome. Launch occurred at 01:32:36 UTC on 16 November 2000. The spacecraft docked with the Nadir port of the Zarya module at 03:47:42 UTC on 18 November. The Kurs docking system failed during docking, and the manual backup, TORU, was used for the docking. Progress M1-4 remained docked for two weeks before undocking at 16:22:52 UTC on 1 December.

Second docking
Following its undocking, Progress M1-4 spent 25 days in free flight, prior to redocking with the same port on 26 December at 11:03:13 UTC. Like the original docking, the TORU system was used, as although the fault with the Kurs system had been resolved, the procedure used to abort the original Kurs docking attempt was irreversible due to the retraction of an antenna that could not be redeployed. It remained docked for 44 days before undocking again at 11:26:04 UTC on 8 February 2001. It was deorbited at 12:59 UTC on the same day. The spacecraft burned up in the atmosphere over the Pacific Ocean, with any remaining debris landing in the ocean at around 13:50 GMT.

Progress M1-4 carried supplies to the International Space Station, including food, water and oxygen for the crew and equipment for conducting scientific research. It was the first Progress spacecraft to resupply an Expedition crew aboard the ISS. Progress M1-4 was the first Progress spacecraft to make two dockings with the ISS, a feat that was not repeated until Progress M-15M in 2012.

See also

 List of Progress flights
 Uncrewed spaceflights to the International Space Station

References

Spacecraft launched in 2000
Spacecraft which reentered in 2001
Progress (spacecraft) missions
Supply vehicles for the International Space Station
Spacecraft launched by Soyuz-U rockets